Frank Graham Lowenstein (born August 16, 1967) is an American lawyer, diplomat and former government official.

Early life and education
He was born on August 16, 1967 in New York City, New York. He is the son of former New York congressman Allard K. Lowenstein and Jennifer Lyman. He graduated from Yale University with a Bachelor of Arts degree in 1990 and from Boston College Law School with a Juris Doctor in 1997.

Legal career
From 1997 to 2003 he practiced law in Boston, Massachusetts.

Political career
From 1990 to 1994 he served as a foreign policy and defense legislative assistant in the office of Senator John Kerry. From 2003 to 2009 he served in numerous positions relating to foreign policy and national security while working on the Kerry Edwards Presidential Campaign and for Senator John Kerry. From 2009 to 2011 he served as staff director and chief counsel of the United States Senate Foreign Relations Committee.

Lobbying
From 2011 to 2013 he served as principal of the Podesta Group.

Diplomatic career
From 2013 to 2014 he served as a senior advisor to the United States Secretary of State. He served as the United States Special Envoy for Middle East Peace from June 2014 until January 2017.

Post-Diplomatic career
From December 2017, he has been serving an Executive Director at APCO Worldwide.

Personal life
He married Peyton McLean West in April 2004. They have two children.

References

1967 births
People from New York City
21st-century American lawyers
20th-century American lawyers
21st-century American diplomats
John Kerry 2004 presidential campaign
United States Department of State officials
Living people
United States Special Envoys
Yale University alumni
Boston College Law School alumni
New York (state) Democrats
United States congressional aides
Massachusetts lawyers
People from Boston